Lone Fountain is an unincorporated community located in Augusta County, Virginia, United States. It has a very small population.

External links
 

Unincorporated communities in Augusta County, Virginia
Unincorporated communities in Virginia